Norbert Owona (1951 – 3 February 2021) was a Cameroonian footballer who played as a midfielder for the Cameroon national team.

Career
Owona scored against Nigeria during the 1970 FIFA World Cup qualification campaign. Owona was part of the team that finished in third place at the 1972 Africa Cup of Nations, scoring in third-place playoff against Zaire.

In August 2018, Owona featured in a television documentary showing that he was homeless and suffering from an inguinal hernia. Following the documentary, it was reported that Samuel Eto'o had arranged for Owona to have somewhere to live. Owona was found dead on a street in Douala, on 3 February 2021, a few days after his birthday. He was aged 70.

References 

1951 births
2021 deaths
Association football midfielders
Cameroonian footballers
Cameroon international footballers
Union Douala players
1972 African Cup of Nations players